The Red House is a 1903 apartment building on the Upper West Side of Manhattan in New York City. It was built on land owned by Canadian architect R. Thomas Short of the Beaux-Arts firm, Harde & Short. He and his firm designed and built the building in a free eclectic mix of French late Gothic. and English Renaissance motifs, using red brick and limestone with bold black-painted mullions in the fenestration. The salamander badge of Henri II  appears high on the flanking wings and in the portico frieze. The center is recessed, behind a triple-arched screen.

It was added to the National Register of Historic Places on September 8, 1983.

See also
National Register of Historic Places listings in Manhattan from 59th to 110th Streets
List of New York City Designated Landmarks in Manhattan from 59th to 110th Streets

References

External links

Upper West Side
Gothic Revival architecture in New York City
Houses completed in 1903
Residential buildings on the National Register of Historic Places in Manhattan
New York City Designated Landmarks in Manhattan